Seorai is a village in Dildarnagar Kamsar region of Ghazipur District of Uttar Pradesh, India. Seorai is the headquarter of Seorai Tehsil. The Seorai tehsil was made a tehsil of the Ghazipur District in year 2016. It consists of 142 villages and one town. Seorai also served as the capital of Kamsaar estate from 1602 to 1620s.

Historical population and history

During the times of Mughals and Nawabs the population of Seorai was much more because a large number of Soldiers lived here who served in Kamsaar estate and the security of the villages of Kamsar. The place was also a capital of Kamsaar estate because of which a large number of merchants settled here and a good trade was done. This was the most populated village in Kamsar-o-bar during the 1600s.

The Kamsaar region was made a jagir whose main admisntratve centre was Seorai and Kuttul Khan was the most powerful person of the region. ￼￼￼Kamsaar was spread over 52 villages. He also build a fort and a Mosque, and Eidgah in the village of Seorai. During the 1860s a large number of people belonging to Kushwaha families settled in the village. The name Seorai was kept because there was also a large population of Sevri families who had settled here during the time of Babur. After the death of Quttul Khan one of his grand sons name as Zamindar Fulan Khan settled here with his family in year 1630. His family lived here for many years. But, the population of Zamindar Fulan Khan family decreased and most of them migrated to village Gorasara in the 1860s and the place was again population with Kushwahas.

References

North India
2016 establishments in Uttar Pradesh